Renier Sosa (born 30 April 1972) is a Cuban table tennis player. He competed in the men's singles event at the 2000 Summer Olympics.

References

1972 births
Living people
Cuban male table tennis players
Olympic table tennis players of Cuba
Table tennis players at the 2000 Summer Olympics
Place of birth missing (living people)